Lesbian, gay, bisexual and transgender (LGBT) people in Qatar face legal challenges not experienced by non-LGBT residents. Sexual acts of male homosexuality are illegal in Qatar, with a punishment for all convicts of up to three years in prison and a fine, and for Muslims duly convicted in a court under sharia law the possibility of a judicially sanctioned capital punishment for homosexuality; however, there are no known cases where the death penalty was judicially enforced for homosexuality, though extra-judicial murders of LGBT people are unverified.

There are prevailing cultural mores in Qatar which view homosexuality and cross-dressing negatively. The Qatari government does not recognize same-sex marriage or civil partnerships, nor does it allow people in Qatar to campaign for LGBT rights.

In November 2008 British performer George Michael performed at a successful concert in Qatar, making him the first openly gay musician to perform in Qatar.

Legality of same-sex sexual acts 
Since 2004, Article 296 of the current Penal Code (Law 11/2004) stipulates imprisonment between one and three years for sodomy between men. This is less severe than the original law that stipulated up to five years' imprisonment for men found to be homosexual (punishment of sexual acts instead of punishment for sexual orientation). The local death penalty for same-gender sex is applicable only to homosexual Muslims because extramarital sex regardless of the gender of the participants is punished by death and because same-gender couples cannot get married. However, there is no evidence that the death penalty has been applied for consensual same-sex relations taking place between adults outside the spaces policed by authorities.

In 1998, an American citizen visiting Qatar was sentenced to six months in prison and 90 lashes for homosexual activity. In the 1990s, the Philippine Overseas Employment Administration informed Philippine workers that gay workers were prohibited in Qatar. This was in response to several mass arrests and deportations of Philippine workers in Qatar for homosexuality.

In 2016, Polish Instagram star King Luxy was arrested in Qatar for allegedly being homosexual. He spent two months in custody before he was released. The Polish embassy claim he was arrested for extortion.

Recognition of same-sex relationships 
Qatari laws concerning marriage, divorce and other family matters are influenced by traditional Islamic morality. Hence, cohabitation is illegal and no legal recognition exists in Qatar for same-sex marriage, civil unions or domestic partnerships.

Transgender rights 

In Qatar, trans women can be arrested for the crime of "impersonating a woman" and while in prison, forcibly detransitioned. This can involve forced surgery to remove breasts, and being sent to "behavioral health centers" where conversion therapy is imposed. Further punishments can involve imprisonment up to seven years, and death by stoning.

2022 FIFA World Cup controversy 

In 2010, shortly after Qatar was selected to host the 2022 FIFA World Cup, FIFA President Sepp Blatter was asked about the political reality for gay people in Qatar, and he responded that gay football fans in Qatar "should refrain from any sexual activities." After being criticized for this remark, Blatter added that: "we FIFA don't want any discrimination. What we want to do is open this game to everybody, and to open it to all cultures, and this is what we are doing in 2022".

In 2011, a member of the Dutch Parliament for the Party for Freedom (PVV) proposed that the Dutch football team play in pink, instead of the country's national color, orange, to protest the gay rights situation in Qatar.

In 2013, the head of Qatar's World Cup bid team, Hassan Al-Thawadi, said that everybody was welcome at the event, so long as they refrained from public display of affection. "Public display of affection is not part of our culture and tradition", he said. In 2013, Kuwait proposed banning gay foreigners from entering any of the countries of the Gulf Cooperation Council, and the GCC agreed to discuss it. However, the GCC backtracked, possibly due to concerns over the effect on Qatar's hosting of the 2022 World Cup.

In November 2021, the Australian footballer Josh Cavallo, the league's only current player who is openly gay, said he would be afraid to travel to Qatar to play, to which Nasser Al Khater, head of the tournament's organizing committee, replied that Cavallo would be "welcome" in the country.

Qatari officials initially stated in December 2020 that, in accordance with FIFA's inclusion policy, it would not restrict the display of pro-LGBT imagery (such as rainbow flags) at matches during the World Cup. However, in April 2022, a senior security official overseeing the tournament stated that there were plans to confiscate pride flags from spectators—allegedly as a safety measure to protect them from altercations with spectators that are anti-LGBT. Fare network criticized the report, arguing that actions against the LGBT community by the state were of a greater concern to those attending the World Cup than the actions of individuals.

Major General Abdulaziz Abdullah Al Ansari stated that fans should also respect the norms of the host country and assured their privacy by adding "Reserve the room together, sleep together, this is something that's not in our concern... We are here to manage the tournament. Let's not go beyond, the individual personal things of fans".

In May 2022 some hotels on FIFA's official list of recommended accommodations for the World Cup event were outright refusing to provide accommodations to same-sex couples. Other hotels on the list indicated they would accept reservations for same-sex couples as long as they hid their relationship in public. FIFA claimed that it would ensure that the hotels mentioned are once again made aware of the strict requirements in relation to welcoming guests in a non-discriminatory manner. During a press conference in Germany on May 20, the Emir of Qatar Sheikh Tamim bin Hamad Al Thani stated that the LGBT visitors would be welcomed to the 2022 World Cup but they need to respect the nation's culture.

In September 2022, according to a report by The Guardian, the FA (Football Association) has assured LGBT couples will not face arrest while holding hands or kissing in public in Qatar. The FA has declared that fans with rainbow flags will not face arrest as long as they do not "disrespect" the local culture and norms by draping flags over mosques in Qatar.

An October 2022 report from Human Rights Watch alleges systemic police brutality against LGBT people in Qatar, based on eyewitness reports from 2019 to 2022.

Transport for London banned Qatar from advertising on London's bus, cab and tube systems after an outcry over the ban on European teams participating in the World Cup in Qatar wearing armbands supporting LGBT+ rights. Subsequently, Qatar said it was reviewing its current and future investments in London.

In 2022, Qatar police arrested protesters after they criticised Qatari law.

In October 2022, the Australian men’s national team called for the host country to recognize same-sex marriage and improve migrant workers rights. Qatar's spokesperson responded by commending the "footballers (for) using their platforms to raise awareness for important matters,” and by stating no country is perfect, and every country has its challenges, also stating new laws and reform often takes time to bed in, including in Australia.

Living conditions

In 2016, an opinion piece that appeared in the outlet Doha News by a gay Qatari man under the pseudonym Majid Al-Qatari that described being gay in Qatar as "jarring" and spoke of the "irreparable damage to [his] mental health", was criticized for "allowing the topic of 'homosexuality' in Qatar to be discussed". It was met with extremely strong reactions.

In 2018, nine entire articles covering gay and transgender rights published from April to July, including a discussion of LGBT rights in Africa, criticism of the US military's transgender ban and a retrospective about a 1973 fire that killed 32 people at a New Orleans gay bar, were censored from the Doha edition of The New York Times International Edition. The Government Communications Office for the State of Qatar issued a statement pledging to investigate the matter.

In 2018, Tom Bosworth, an openly gay British race walker, said that he was ready to risk prison to defend LGBT rights in Qatar during the 2019 World Championships in Athletics. He finished seventh at the 2019 World Championships.

In June 2019, although the laws in Qatar still criminalise homosexuality, its international pubcaster Al Jazeera Media Network's AJ+ marked the month as LGBTQ Pride Month with a tweet about speaking to the cast of Queer Eye on LGBT issues. This led many online users to point out online the paradox that AJ+ discusses and encourages recognition of gay rights outside Qatar, while Qatar censors LGBT content.

In February 2020, Northwestern University in Qatar cancelled an event featuring Mashrou' Leila following anti-LGBT backlash.

In December 2021 Nasser Al Khater, the CEO of the 2022 World Cup in Qatar, said that "Nobody feels threatened here, nobody feels unsafe here" but added that  " ... public display of affection is frowned upon, and that goes across the board – across the board. Qatar is a modest country ... They [gay people] will be coming to Qatar as fans of a football tournament. They can do whatever any other human being would do. What I'm saying is Qatar, from a public-display-of-affection factor, is conservative". The tournament organiser also welcomed Josh Cavallo, the world's only current openly gay top-flight professional footballer, at the World Cup. Cavallo had said that to know that the World Cup was being held " ... in a country that doesn't support gay people and puts us at risk of our own life, that does scare me and makes me re-evaluate – is my life more important than doing something really good in my career?".

In May 2022, Naser Mohamed, a physician based in the US, became the first Qatari to publicly come out as a gay man.

Summary table

See also

LGBT rights in the Middle East
LGBT rights in Asia
LGBT in Islam
Death penalty for homosexuality
Human rights in Qatar

References

External links
UK government travel advice for Qatar: Local laws and customs

Qatar
Qatar
Human rights in Qatar
Law of Qatar
LGBT in Qatar
Persecution of LGBT people